Moore's Prairie Township is one of sixteen townships in Jefferson County, Illinois, USA.  As of the 2010 census, its population was 347 and it contained 142 housing units.

Geography
The township is centered at 38°10'N 88°45'W (38.169,-88.754).

Adjacent townships
 Pendleton Township (north)
 Dahlgren Township, Hamilton County (east)
 Knights Prairie Township, Hamilton County (southeast)
 Northern Township, Franklin County (south)
 Ewing Township, Franklin County (southwest)
 Spring Garden Township (west)
 Dodds Township (northwest)

Demographics

Cemeteries
Cochrane Cemetery
Four Graves Cemetery
Grothoff Cemetery
Wilbanks Cemetery
Lowery Hill Cemetery
One Grave Cemetery
Shelton Cemetery
Sugar Camp Cemetery

Major highways
  Illinois Route 142

School districts
 Hamilton County Community Unit School District 10

Political districts
 Illinois's 12th congressional district
 State House District 107
 State Senate District 54

References
 
 United States Census Bureau 2007 TIGER/Line Shapefiles
 United States National Atlas

External links
 City-Data.com
 Illinois State Archives

Townships in Jefferson County, Illinois
Mount Vernon, Illinois micropolitan area
Townships in Illinois